Paola Celli (born 23 August 1967) is an Italian former synchronized swimmer who competed in the 1992 and 1996 Summer Olympics.

References

1967 births
Living people
Italian synchronized swimmers
Olympic synchronized swimmers of Italy
Synchronized swimmers at the 1992 Summer Olympics
Synchronized swimmers at the 1996 Summer Olympics
Synchronized swimmers at the 1991 World Aquatics Championships